"Nigga What, Nigga Who (Originator 99)"  (or "Jigga What, Jigga Who (Originator 99)" for the song's title was often changed to avoid airing the word "Nigga") is a single by rapper Jay-Z's third album Vol. 2... Hard Knock Life. It was released on March 1, 1999. The song is produced by Timbaland and features two artists: Big Jaz, who raps one verse and Amil, who speaks the track's chorus.

In 2004, the song was mashed with Linkin Park's "Faint" in the six track EP Collision Course.

Track listing
 "Nigga What, Nigga Who (Originator 99)"
 "Ain't No Nigga"
 "Bring It On"

Vinyl
B-Side
 "Ain't No Nigga"

Critical reception
In 2015, NME ranked the song number seven on their list of the ten greatest Jay-Z songs, and in 2019, Rolling Stone ranked the song number eight on their list of the 50 greatest Jay-Z songs.

Charts

See also
List of songs recorded by Jay-Z

References

External links

1999 singles
Amil songs
Jay-Z songs
Song recordings produced by Timbaland
Songs written by Jay-Z
Songs written by Timbaland
Songs written by Jaz-O
Roc-A-Fella Records singles
1999 songs